The men's Greco-Roman 120 kg competition of the wrestling events at the 2011 Pan American Games in Guadalajara, Mexico, was held on October 20 at the CODE II Gymanasium.  The defending champion was Mijaín López of Cuba.

This Greco-Roman wrestling competition consisted of a single-elimination tournament, with a repechage used to determine the winner of two bronze medals. The two finalists faced off for gold and silver medals. Each wrestler who lost to one of the two finalists moved into the repechage, culminating in a pair of bronze medal matches featuring the semifinal losers each facing the remaining repechage opponent from his half of the bracket.

Each bout consisted of up to three rounds, lasting two minutes apiece. The wrestler who scored more points in each round was the winner of that round; the bout ended when one wrestler had won two rounds, and thus the match.

Schedule
All times are Central Standard Time (UTC-6).

Results

Finals round

Repechage round
Two bronze medals were awarded.

References

Wrestling at the 2011 Pan American Games
Greco-Roman wrestling